Parvin Farhadi Khah (born 30 March 1992), known as Parvin Farhadi, is an Iranian footballer who plays as a midfielder. She has been a member of the senior Iran women's national team.

References

External links

1992 births
Living people
Iranian women's footballers
Iran women's international footballers
Women's association football midfielders
People from Ardakan
21st-century Iranian women